"Made You Look" is a song by American singer-songwriter Meghan Trainor from her fifth major-label studio album, Takin' It Back (2022). Trainor co-wrote it with Sean Douglas and its producer, Federico Vindver. Epic Records released the song as the album's second single on October 31, 2022. A doo-wop song which recalls earlier styles of popular music, it was inspired by Trainor's insecurities about body image and encourages listeners to embrace their natural beauty and confidence.

Music critics commented on the flirtatious composition of "Made You Look" and compared it to Trainor's past songs. An online dance challenge set to the song became a trend on video-sharing service TikTok in 2022. In the United States, it peaked at number 11 on the Billboard Hot 100, becoming Trainor's first top-20 single since "Me Too" (2016). The song reached the top 10 in Australia, Belgium, Canada, Ireland, New Zealand, Norway, Singapore, the United Kingdom, and Vietnam. Its music video, which premiered on Candy Crush Saga in October 2022, features bright colours and cameos by social media influencers. Trainor performed the song on television shows such as The Today Show, The Tonight Show Starring Jimmy Fallon, and The Drew Barrymore Show.

Background and release

Meghan Trainor achieved commercial success with her debut major-label studio album Title (2015), which produced three top-10 singles on the US Billboard Hot 100. She struggled while creating her third one, Treat Myself (2020), rewriting it four times as an attempt of "adapting to what's going on in the music industry" after the preceding singles underperformed. After the song "Title" attained viral popularity on video-sharing service TikTok in 2021, Trainor announced her intention to pivot to its doo-wop sound on her fifth major-label studio album. She stated the elevated emotions and strength from her pregnancy helped her build trust in her songwriting instincts. TikTok was highly influential on Trainor's creative process for the album: "Everything I write I'm like 'Yo, TikTok's gonna eat this up,' like I truly um am focused on like, my fans on TikTok, [...] that's my home and I'm writing for TikTok." She gained popularity on the platform while regularly sharing clips and other content with influencer Chris Olsen. Trainor released the single "Bad for Me" in June 2022.

Trainor wrote "Made You Look" alongside Sean Douglas and Federico Vindver. Her body image insecurities after pregnancy and an exercise where her therapist asked her to look at herself naked for five minutes inspired the song. Trainor came up with the lines "I'll make you double take / Soon as I walk away / Call up your chiropractor just in case your neck break", a reference to how Trainor's husband Daryl Sabara bends his neck to look at her when she leaves a room. Other lyrics were inspired by the things he does to treat her well. Wanting to create another "self-confident banger that [she] always do[es] on [her] albums", Trainor studied the relatability of her song "All About That Bass" (2014) while writing the track.

"Made You Look" was serviced to hot adult contemporary radio stations in the United States as the second single from Takin' It Back (2022) on October 31, 2022. The song was sent for radio airplay in Italy on November 18, 2022. On December 9, 2022, its a cappella version, featuring guest vocals from Olsen, Scott Hoying, and influencers Elyse Myers and Sri, was released alongside an accompanying music video. An online dance challenge choreographed by TikTok users Brookie and Jessie set to "Made You Look" became a trend on the platform, following which around two million user-generated videos also used the song. The song was supported by a Joel Corry remix on December 31, 2022, and its instrumental and sped-up versions in January 2022. On January 27, its remix version featuring Kim Petras was released and serviced for radio airplay in Italy. Petras adds new ad libs and high notes during her verse on "Made You Look". She recorded her vocals in Trainor's home studio, and recalled the experience: "I had 'Made You Look' stuck in my head for months, [...] then when I got asked to jump on it, I was really, really excited. I've never worked with an artist who wanted to track me and comp my vocals and do it all together."

Composition and lyrics

"Made You Look" is two minutes and 14 seconds long. Vindver produced, programmed, and engineered the song. He plays the keyboards and percussion, Jesse McGinty plays the baritone saxophone and trombone, and Mike Cordone plays the trumpet. Jeremie Inhaber mixed the song, and Randy Merrill mastered it at Sterling Sound in New York City.

Musically, "Made You Look" is a doo-wop song, which recalls earlier styles of popular music. Vindver incorporated horns into the song's instrumentation to achieve the style. Along with layered harmonies, it prominently features the bass and brass instruments, which Riffs Piper Westrom thought harken back to the sound of Title. "Made You Look" has a call and response hook; Peter Piatkowski of PopMatters described it as a "spiritual sequel" to "All About That Bass" due to their shared "pouty, surly delivery and the girl group arrangement".

The lyrics of "Made You Look" discuss the theme of self-love; Trainor encourages her female listeners to champion their natural beauty and confidence. She namechecks high-end luxury fashion houses, including Gucci and Louis Vuitton, and insists she looks better donning just her hoodie and "hotter when [her] morning hair's a mess". Trainor declares that onlookers would find her walk jaw-dropping and become obsessed with her once they "get a taste"; she also uses the slang term "14-karat cake" to refer to her backside.

Critical reception
Music critics compared "Made You Look" to Trainor's past songs. Writing for Far Out, Tyler Golsen believed it achieved a correct balance between nostalgia for her early music and older pop music in general. Although he refused to call "Made You Look" a good song and stated he probably would not listen to it again, he thought it was "certainly [...] a Meghan Trainor song" and praised her branding efforts. AllMusic's Stephen Thomas Erlewine cited the song's inclusion of fashion house names as an example of moments on Takin' It Back where her devotion to bringing back Titles spirit means "that the attitude and melody can occasionally seem preserved in amber". Rolling Stone placed it at number 69 on their list of 2022's best songs, and Tomás Mier positively compared it to Trainor's previous work and praised the "unforgettable lyrics and catchy production".

The lyrics and flirtatious approach of "Made You Look" were discussed by critics. Martina Inchingolo of the Associated Press thought Trainor sounded "loud[er] and sexier" on the song. Writing for Renowned for Sound, Max Akass believed she displayed a "cheeky, flirty attitude" on it, which made for uncomplicated but efficacious pop music. Mier wrote that Petras delivered a "welcome sexy verse" on her remix of "Made You Look". In a negative review, Marsella Evans of Plugged In criticized the song's obsession with physical beauty and the idea of seeking attention by taking off one's clothes. Although she accused parts of the lyrics of promoting materialism, she wrote that they encourage valuing natural beauty.

Commercial performance
"Made You Look" debuted at number 95 on the US Billboard Hot 100 issued dated November 5, 2022. The song earned 9.3 millions streams in its second tracking week and entered the Streaming Songs chart at number 49, Trainor's first entry since "Me Too" (2016). It peaked at number 11 on the Billboard Hot 100, becoming her first song to enter its top 40 also since "Me Too". "Made You Look" was Trainor's first number-one on the Adult Top 40 chart since "Like I'm Gonna Lose You" (2015). In Canada, "Made You Look" reached number seven on the Canadian Hot 100. The song charted at number two on the UK Singles Chart, becoming her first top-10 single since "Marvin Gaye" (2015). It received a Gold certification in the United Kingdom from the British Phonographic Industry.

In Australia, "Made You Look" peaked at number three and was certified 2× Platinum by the Australian Recording Industry Association. The song reached number two in New Zealand and earned a Platinum certification from Recorded Music NZ. It became Trainor's first top-10 single on the Billboard Global 200, charting at number six. Elsewhere, "Made You Look" peaked within the top 10, at number two in Singapore, number three in Belgium, Iceland, and Ireland, number five in Vietnam, number six in Latvia, number seven in Norway, and number eight in Malaysia. Additionally, the song charted within the top 20, at number 11 in Hungary, number 13 in Croatia and the Netherlands, number 15 in Paraguay, number 16 in Austria, and number 19 in Switzerland. It received a Gold certification in Italy, Sweden, and Switzerland.

Music video and promotion
The music video for "Made You Look" was released on October 20, 2022, exclusive to Candy Crush Saga for 24 hours, followed by a wide release the following day. Trainor stated: "I knew for this music video that I wanted it to be bright, fun colors. That's my thing, always ... but I wanted this to feel like (an) elevated (version of 'All About That) Bass,' more saturated." It depicts her showing out various outfits at a press conference, driving in a car, and dancing in a room. Cameos include TikTok influencers Hoying, JoJo Siwa, Drew Afualo, and Olsen as dancers, and Sabara as the car driver. An alternate version of the video featuring only Trainor's dance sequence was later released, titled "Made You Look (Again)".

On October 21, 2022, Trainor performed "Made You Look" live for the first time on The Today Show. Three days later, she reprised the song on The Tonight Show Starring Jimmy Fallon. Trainor sang it as a medley with "Here Comes Santa Claus" for The Wonderful World of Disney: Magical Holiday Celebration on November 27, 2022. On December 13, 2022, she performed "Made You Look" on The Drew Barrymore Show. Trainor reprised the song at the eighth season of Australian Idol on February 27, 2023.

Credits and personnel
Credits are adapted from the liner notes of Takin' It Back.
Federico Vindver – producer, songwriter, programming, engineering, keyboards, percussion
Meghan Trainor – songwriter
Sean Douglas – songwriter
Jesse McGinty – baritone saxophone, trombone
Mike Cordone – trumpet
Randy Merrill – mastering
Jeremie Inhaber – mixing

Charts

Weekly charts

Monthly charts

Year-end charts

Certifications

Release history

References

2022 singles
2022 songs
Body image in popular culture
Doo-wop songs
Epic Records singles
Meghan Trainor songs
Number-one singles in Poland